Robert 'Sparrow' Brown (1856 – 10 January 1904) was a Scottish footballer, who played for Dumbarton and Scotland.

He was one of two contemporary players of the same name and club. To distinguish them, they were given nicknames 'Plumber' and 'Sparrow'.

Honours
Dumbarton
Scottish Cup: Winners 1882–83
Runners Up 1880–81, 1881–82
Dumbartonshire Cup: Winners 1884–85
Glasgow Charity Cup: Runners Up 1881–82, 1884–85
3 representative caps for Dumbartonshire, scoring one goal
3 representative caps for Scotch Counties, scoring two goals.

References

External links
Robert Brown (Dumbarton Football Club Historical Archive)
London Hearts profile
Scottish Football Historical Archive

1856 births
Date of birth uncertain
1904 deaths
Scottish footballers
Scotland international footballers
Dumbarton F.C. players
Association football wingers
Sportspeople from Dumbarton
Footballers from West Dunbartonshire